Robert McCullogh (20 June 1892 – 1972) was an English professional footballer who played as an inside forward for Sunderland.

References

1892 births
1972 deaths
Footballers from Gateshead
English footballers
Association football inside forwards
Sunderland A.F.C. players
South Shields F.C. (1889) players
English Football League players